Aihui may refer to:

Aihui District, in Heihe, Heilongjiang, China
Aigun, or Aihui town, historic town of China in northern Manchuria, in Aihui District